Leonard Waterman (18 February 1892 – 1 January 1952) was an Australian cricketer. He played in five first-class matches for Queensland between 1931 and 1933.

See also
 List of Queensland first-class cricketers

References

External links
 

1892 births
1952 deaths
Australian cricketers
Queensland cricketers
Cricketers from Brisbane